Boris Naumovich Ginsburg (June 21, 1933, Kryvyi Rih — October 23, 1963, Kyiv, Ukrainian SSR) was a Soviet painter and graphic artist.

Biography 
Boris Naumovich Ginsburg was born on June 21, 1933 in the city of Kryvyi Rih. He spent his youth and his brief life in Kyiv.
From 1941 to 1944, together with his mother and younger sister, he was evacuated to Krasnodar and later to Turkmenistan. In 1947 the family joined their father in Magadan, where Boris spent his childhood years. His talent for drawing, discovered in early childhood, brought the young man to T.G. Shevchenko Kyiv Republican Art School. Having graduated, he entered the Graphic department of the Kyiv Art Institute (1952–1958). He was fortunate to have V. Kasiyan and I. Pleschinsky as his tutors, and A. Paschenko, a famous Ukrainian graphic artist and a talented teacher, as his thesis supervisor. He graduated from the Art Institute with the honours degree and in the same year the twenty-five-year-old became the member of the Union of Artists of Ukraine. While still a student, his works were exhibited at Ukraine and USSR wide exhibitions. They attracted the attention of laymen and specialists alike with their perfection of form, profound meaning and accomplished craftsmanship. During his brief life the artist managed to create, monumental in their stature and execution, a series of lithographs dedicated to creative labour: "About People of Work" (1957–1958), "The New Ukrainian Semiletka Buildings" (1959–1960), "People of the Semiletka" (1960–1961) Like the majority of Ukrainian artists of the time, he engaged with the literary classics, creating a series of works dedicated to T. Shevchenko (1961–1962), illustrations to the great poet's works and to L. Ukrainka's poetry. Despite these considerable achievements for a budding artist, in 1960-1962 he continued to study at the creative workshops of the Academy of Arts of the USSR in Kyiv, under the patronage of the National Artist of the USSR Michail Deregus.

Work 
 
The artist was destined to create his entire legacy in just five years. There was no early, middle or late period in his professional life. This established gradation was compacted into five short years filled with creative search, struggle with humdrum existence, faith in his talent and irrepressible strive for perfection. At the time there were neither monographs nor extensive articles in art journals dedicated to his work, as he was just a budding young artist. All this and recognition, success and fame were just a beckoning alluring dream then. And it all was bound to happen to the artist, as, with his thesis alone, he revealed his great talent to the world. His thesis series of easel graphic works About People of Work (1958) demonstrated not only a rather high level of academic proficiency, but also Boris’ own perspective on the obligatory, in those days, depiction of socialist everyday life. He brought a personality to the foreground of his graphic sheet, abandoning the stereotype of portraying "an ordinary Soviet man". For the six completed lithographs of the series the artist created numerous sketches, demonstrating a wide variety of the compositional ideas and subject interpretations. Alongside genre drawings, the artist completed portraits in coal, creating an expressive gallery of manly, proud and intellectual images of steelmakers.

The New Ukrainian Semiletka Buildings (1959–1960) is also a lithographic series, created on a commission by the Union of Artists, in which, alongside the key moments of Kremenchug Hydro Electric Station construction, a lot of attention is paid to the rank and file participants of the grandiose building project. In this series the artist emphasizes images of women, as if juxtaposing the beauty and fragility of the female figures with the surrounding construction giants.
The artist also remained true to the humanistic concept of art in the third lithographic series The People of Semiletka (1960–1961). Reminiscence of the Black Sea became the most vivid and the most unconventional of the series. Through the prism of his depicting the fishermen's work one could clearly observe the unmistakable romantic notes of the European art tradition.

Not only was Boris Ginsburg a master of lithography, he also had a perfect command of watercolour technique; he sensed its specificities and masterfully varied intense and serene colours. It gave the artist an opportunity to create, amazing in their execution, watercolours of sea views, piers and ships at anchor. Crimean landscapes always excited Boris’ creative imagination. The biggest attraction for him was the subtle beauty of Koktebel, which had become a magnet for creative circles when Maximillian Voloshyn settled there. The artist's refined personality, as if merging with the translucent watercolours, was expressed in the lyrical landscapes, imbued with gentle crystal fragility.

Although for the artist the sea was not only primordial beauty imbued with inimitable harmony, but also a dwelling place of the manmade objects- the ships. In depiction of the latter he predominantly employs graphic techniques: coal sketching, graphite pencil, drypoint print, etching and linocut print. He is unsurpassed as regards compositional variations in depicting ships or fishermen's life. Every sheet is representative of the original nonrecurring compositional scheme, the most corresponding to realizing each concrete artistic idea.

The lyrical nature of the artist's character, to a great extent, defined his perspective on the interpretation of the soviet woman-worker image. Remaining confined to the unavoidable industrial themes of the official commissions, he first and for most emphasizes the femininity in his fish factory workers, helmswomen, attendants and electricians. Even the drab shapelessness of their working uniforms is powerless to conceal it. Every work reveals to the viewer a "soviet Madonna"; slightly mysterious with her hint of a smile and averted daydreaming gaze. Perhaps she is not always beautiful, but inimitably unique, and thusly so attractive.

However, his favourite and most frequently portrayed model was his wife Zoya. He could draw her endlessly: at the seaside, sleeping, lying sick in bed with a high fever, running to the skating rink, reading a book, dreaming, sad, leaning over her textbooks and exhausted after a busy working day. Everyone expresses his love as he can: writing poems, bringing flowers, showering with gifts. Boris Ginsburg expressed his love with what he knew best: his countless portrait drawings of his young wife.

Amongst his works there also were commissioned portraits of outstanding historical personalities: Nikolay Przhevalsky, Victor Hugo and Heinrich Heine. For each one he managed not only to convey the portrait features, but also recreate a characteristic emotional image, as some echo of their famous literary masterpieces or scientific achievements.

His amazing ability to see beauty in the mundane was reflected in the artist's approach to the landscape. His pencil drawings are, indeed, unique in their invocation of the postwar Kyiv atmosphere. Old wooden cottages, curved streets, infrequent cars, Kudryavsky Descent, Andreevsky Descent, Podol; on these sheets the quiet city life of the 1950s is forever preserved on these sheets by the keen hand of the artist. Incidentally, whatever genre Boris Ginsburg employed, he always found the trappings of life quite odious. So it is not by chance, that his cityscapes are always genuine and authentic; they win the viewer over with their sincerity and spirituality.

Boris Ginsburg is also concise and even fragmentary in his landscapes-miniatures. What is meant here is not size. A little forest clearing, lonely oak trees or pines on the edge of a meadow, a delicately lacy tree brunch in early spring; everything is imbued with the solemnity of being, affirmation of the beauty of the mundane. An apple tree in bloom, a little bridge over a stream and a village street are all elevated to the eternal and the beautiful in the eye of the artist.

Every nation, every people has its own eternal cultural values. For the Ukrainians they are first and foremost Taras Shevchenko's and Lesya Ukrainka's poetry.

Boris Ginsburg was inspired not only by the literary works of the Great Kobzar, but also by his tragic destiny. It resulted in the creation of printed lithographs reflecting the most dramatic moments from the poet's life, when he was exiled by court order to a distant military outpost and banned from writing and drawing. To some degree it was reminiscent of the events in Boris Ginsburg's own life. In the artist's private archive there is a small notebook with sketches of numerous searches for various characters from T. Shevchenko's poems. The only completed works were created for the poems "The Owl" and "The Neophyte". The illustrations to Lesya Ukrainka's poems "The Sinner" and "In the Catacombs" are imbued with the unvanquished spirit. It's no coincidence that of all her poems the artist chose the ones with main themes of strong spirit, freedom or striving to break out of slavish submission even by paying the ultimate price of one's own life. These were the last works in Boris Ginsburg artistic career.

"It is very difficult to make people, who did not know Boris, his inner world, fine sense of humour, cheerful laughter and secret sorrow in his eyes, encyclopaedic knowledge, complete and utter helplessness in day to day life and constant process of creative search to understand. It is a complicated task, but it is also my duty, so I will try." It was an introduction to the memoirs written by Boris Ginsburg's widow Zoya Davydovna Ginsburg. It was exclusively due to her efforts, her amazing charm and energy (despite her quite advanced years) that the name of Boris Ginsburg was brought back from oblivion. She became the main instigator and organizer of three personal exhibitions (1964, 2010, 2013), the author and sponsor in creating an album dedicated to the artist life's work "Boris Ginsburg, A Bright Light of a Short Life." Zoya Davydovna also wrote the most touching chapter of this book: recollections of their youth, which are paramount to coming close to understanding the work and personality of Boris Ginsburg, feel his living presence, hear his words, comprehend his ideas, share his emotions and joy brought on by first success.

These were the first steps of his creative life, such a promising beginning ...

In one of the letters to his parents he wrote: "It started snowing a little today, you could see through the window that the street was already white. The day flew by, tomorrow once again business to attend to, work. I couldn’t say anything definite about work though; everything is still at a very early stage, I don’t even know which one of my numerous ideas to choose. There are plenty of sketches; plenty of themes, there are things to work on ..." (November 4, 1962).

Exhibitions 
Exhibited since 1957. Worked in easel and printed book graphic. The main works: : "About People of Work" (1957–1958), "The New Ukrainian Semiletka Buildings" (1959–1960), "People of the Semiletka" (1960–1961) "T. G. Shevchenko" (1961–1962) and illustrations to L. Ukrainka's works (1962) and T. Shevchenko's works (1963).

Link 
 https://www.youtube.com/watch?v=DYbeVrF9NSA Video. Ukrainian language.

Gallery 

.

1933 births
1963 deaths